The Golden Goblet Award for Best Cinematography (Chinese: 金爵奖最佳摄影) is a prize given to the films in the main category of competition at the Shanghai International Film Festival.

Award Winners

References

Lists of films by award
Shanghai International Film Festival
Awards for best cinematography